Jim Loriot (16 January 1879 – 18 August 1951) was an Australian rules footballer who played with Carlton in the Victorian Football League (VFL).

References

External links 

Jim Loriot's profile at Blueseum

1879 births
1951 deaths
Australian rules footballers from Melbourne
Carlton Football Club players
People from Fitzroy, Victoria